Oishinbo a Japanese anime television series based on the manga series of the same name written by Tetsu Kariya and illustrated by Akira Hanasaki. It was broadcast for 136 episodes on Nippon TV and its network affiliates between 17 October 1988 and 17 March 1992. The series was produced by Shin-Ei Animation and directed by Yoshio Takeuchi.
For the first 23 episodes the opening theme is YOU and the ending theme is TWO OF US both performed by Megumi Yuki. For the rest of the episodes the opening theme is Dang Dang ki ni naru and the ending theme is Line both performed by Yuma Nakamura. The series was followed by two TV specials that aired in 1992 and 1993.

The series was released on VHS tapes, but it was not until 2016 the series was remastered in high-definition and released on Blu-ray.
Subsequently, the series was released on streaming platforms in Japan like Amazon Prime and Netflix. However some episodes are not included in the streamed version of the series.

In October 2020 the series started streaming on YouTube with English subtitles.

Television series

Episode list

Japanese episode titles and airdates are taken from The Amazon Japan series page.

Television Specials

Notes

References 

Oishinbo